Myroslava Sopilka, real name Yulia Semenivna Mysko-Pastushenko (29 August 1897 - 28 November 1937) was a Ukrainian poet and novelist.

Biography 
Myroslava Sopilka was born in Vynnyky, Lviv oblast on 29 August 1897 as one of five children in the family of peasants.  

Her works were first published in 1928 in the magazines Vikna, and various newspapers. At the end of 1930, she moved with her husband and 2 children to Soviet Ukraine, first to the city of Kamianets-Podilskyi, where she worked in the local history museum. Then (1932) Myroslava Sopilka moved to Kharkiv. She was a member of the Western Ukraine literary organization. In 1931 she published the book of poems Working Hands. She also acted as a novelist, leaving the novel The Cozy City of Superstitions. 

On May 12, 1929, Myroslava Sopilka was among the founders of the literary group  - with her were Vasyl Bobynskyi, Andriy Voloshchak, Oleksandr Gavrylyuk, Yaroslav Galan, Petro Kozlanyuk, Yaroslav Kondra, Nina Matulivna, and Stepan Tudor. 

On September 30, 1937, Myroslava Sopilka was arrested together with her husband Mykhailo Pastushenko and accused of spying for Polish intelligence. During the interrogations, neither she nor her husband compromised themselves in anything and rejected all the accusations of the investigation. And yet, on November 22, 1937, a special meeting of the The People's Commissariat for Internal Affairs of the USSR (NKVD) sentenced the poetess to be shot. The sentence was executed on November 28 in Kyiv. Most likely, her body was buried at the Lukyaniv Cemetery. For a long time, nothing was known about her fate. It was officially believed that she died in exile on November 18, 1942.  

Myroslava Sopilka was rehabilitated posthumously.  

A street in the city of Vynnyky is named after Myroslava Sopilka.

In 1973, a collection of selected works of Myroslava Sopilka To the Sun was published.

References 

1897 births
1937 deaths
Executed Renaissance
People from Lviv Oblast
Ukrainian women poets
Soviet poets
Soviet rehabilitations